Joseph Gregg House is a historic home located in Kennett Township, Chester County, Pennsylvania. The original section was built about 1737.  Additions were made about 1820, about 1860, and in 1986.  The original section is a -story, three bay, brick Colonial farmhouse with a gable roof. It is a rectangular structure measuring 20 feet by 30 feet and sits on a stone foundation.  The 1820/1860 addition is constructed of rubble fieldstone.

It was added to the National Register of Historic Places in 1994.

References

Houses on the National Register of Historic Places in Pennsylvania
Houses completed in 1737
Houses in Chester County, Pennsylvania
National Register of Historic Places in Chester County, Pennsylvania